Narendra Prasad Misra (b. 1931, d. 5 September 2021), originally from Gwalior, was an Indian physician. He lived in Bhopal in the Indian State of  Madhya Pradesh. Misra helped save thousands of lives during the Bhopal gas tragedy through his service.

Early life 

Misra is originally from Gwalior. He secured his MBBS degree from Gandhi Medical College.

Career 
After completing his studies, he joined the college as an assistant professor in 1969. He rose to become head of the college's Medicine Department. According to media reports, "in the 1980s, his popularity had increased so much that there was not even a place to set foot on in one of his programs in Gwalior". He retired from service as the Dean of the college.

Bhopal disaster 
The disaster was caused by a gas leak accident on the night of 2–3 December 1984 at the Union Carbide India Limited (UCIL) pesticide plant in Bhopal. It is considered among the world's worst industrial disasters. 

Misra made a system that could handle more than ten thousand victims in Hamidia Hospital. Hamidia Hospital is a multispeciality tertiary care teaching hospital affiliated to Gandhi Medical College. His prompt intervention helped save thousands of lives.  He stated,
"The first problem was that of numbers. My team treated 170,000 patients in one day. The second problem was lack of information. UCC informed us that the gas was not toxic. They insisted that most of the casualties were result of panic created by people running and inhaling gas. I tried to organize bulk supplies of medicines. I rang up colleagues and civil surgeon friends in neighboring towns like Sehore, Raisen, Hosangabad, and Vidisha and asked them to send supply of medicines and necessary staff like nurses and ward boys. I called up local chemists and asked them to pool in their stocks . . ."

Misra conducted clinical studies related to the tragedy and published many research papers. After retirement he continued to provide medical help and advice to the survivors.

Recognition

In 2022 the Government of India posthumously conferred the Padma Shri award upon him, the third-highest award in the Padma series of awards. The award named him "Bhopal's Senior Most  Doctor known for developing treatment protocols for victims of Bhopal Gas Tragedy as well as Covid."

"Dr B C Rai Award" by Medical Council of India (1992)
"Gifted Teacher Award" by the Association of Physicians of India (1995)

Books
Mishra authored a book on cardiology which is popular among cardiology students. The book titled "Progress in Cardiology"  was released by the then President of India  Shankar Dayal Sharma and the Crown Prince of Britain.

Research publications

See also
Padma Shri Award recipients in the year 2022

References

Recipients of the Padma Shri in medicine